Nathaniel Frampton Davis Thomson (29 May 1839 – 2 September 1896) was an Australian cricketer who played in the first two Tests ever played, in 1877.

When Australia won the toss on 15 March 1877 and elected to bat, Nat Thomson came out with Australia's No. 1 batsman Charles Bannerman to form the first-ever Test batting partnership. Thomson was 37 years 290 days old, which made him the second-oldest player on the ground behind England's James Southerton, who remains to this day the oldest Test debutant ever. Thomson has the distinction of being the first batsman dismissed in a Test match, when he was clean bowled by England's Allen Hill for 1 when the score was 2. In the Second Test a fortnight later he made 41 in the second innings, adding 88 for the first wicket with Dave Gregory.

Thomson began his career with New South Wales in the 1850s principally as a fieldsman, but his batting improved, and he scored New South Wales' first inter-colonial fifty in 1867–68. He was offered a position on the Australian touring team to England in 1878 but declined due to business reasons and thus finished his brief international career.

Until 1993 Wisden listed him as Nathaniel Thompson (without middle names), born 21 April 1838 in Birmingham, England, and the brief biographical details in Bill Frindall's Wisden Book of Test Cricket 1876-77 to 1977-78 list him as such. This would have made him the earliest-born Australian Test cricketer. However, a note in the Births and Deaths section of the 1993 Wisden announced that research had "led to a change in the details for N.F.D. Thomson (formerly listed as Thompson)", and since that time Thomson's name and birth information have been listed as in this article. Thomson and Ned Gregory are now assumed to have been born on the same day, and jointly hold the distinction of being the earliest-born Australian Test cricketer.

References

External links

1839 births
1896 deaths
Australia Test cricketers
New South Wales cricketers
Australian cricketers
Wicket-keepers